A Turma do Balão Mágico is the fourth studio album by Brazilian band Turma do Balão Mágico, released on September 9, 1985, by CBS Records. It was the first album without Vimerson Cavanillas due to change of voice and was replaced by Ricardinho.

According to O Globo, the album sold one million copies.

Track List

Side A
 "Barato Bom É da Barata" (with Erasmo Carlos)
 "Não Dá Pra Parar a Música" (with Grupo Metrô)
 "Fim de Semana" (with Dominó)
 "Tic-tac" (with Castrinho)
 "Trem Mineiro"
 "Cortaram Meu Verão"

Side B
 "Chega Mais um Pouco" (with Dominó)
 "Garota e Garoto" (with Moraes Moreira)
 "Coração" - solos: Simony & Jairzinho
 "Um Raio de Sol" (with Baby Consuelo & Pepeu Gomes)
 "Soldadinho de Chumbo" - solos: Mike, Simony & Jairzinho
 "Mochila Azul" - solo: Jairzinho

Bibliography
Barcinski, André (2014). Pavões Misteriosos — 1974-1983: A explosão da música pop no Brasil. São Paulo: Editora Três Estrelas. 

References 

1985 albums
Portuguese-language albums
Sony Music Brazil albums
CBS Records albums